Dioryctria taiella is a species of snout moth in the genus Dioryctria. It was described by Hans Georg Amsel in 1970 and is known from Afghanistan and Pakistan.

The larvae feed on Arceuthobium oxycedri. Early instars bore into the aerial shoots, while mature larvae feed externally, mainly at the bases of the shoots and cause shoot mortality.

References

Moths described in 1970
taiella